The 2015 Engie Open de Biarritz was a professional tennis tournament played on outdoor clay courts. It was the thirteenth edition of the tournament and part of the 2015 ITF Women's Circuit, offering a total of $100,000 in prize money. It took place in Biarritz, France, on 7–13 September 2015.

Singles main draw entrants

Seeds 

 1 Rankings as of 31 August 2015

Other entrants 
The following players received wildcards into the singles main draw:
  Constance Sibille
  Jade Suvrijn
  Harmony Tan

The following players received entry from the qualifying draw:
  Tatiana Búa
  Başak Eraydın
  Amra Sadiković
  Cristina Sánchez Quintanar

The following players received entry by a lucky loser spot:
  Olga Sáez Larra
  Gaia Sanesi

Champions

Singles

 Laura Siegemund def.  Romina Oprandi, 7–5, 6–3

Doubles

 Başak Eraydın /  Lidziya Marozava def.  Réka-Luca Jani /  Stephanie Vogt, 6–4, 6–4

External links 
 2015 Engie Open de Biarritz at ITFtennis.com
 Official website 

2015 ITF Women's Circuit
2015
2015 in French tennis